Stefan Georgiev (born 20 May 1977) is an alpine skier from Bulgaria.  He competed at the 1998 Winter Olympics, 2002 Winter Olympics, 2006 Winter Olympics and the 2010 Winter Olympics.  His best result was a 16th place in the combined in 2002.

References

External links

1977 births
Living people
Bulgarian male alpine skiers
Olympic alpine skiers of Bulgaria
Alpine skiers at the 1998 Winter Olympics
Alpine skiers at the 2002 Winter Olympics
Alpine skiers at the 2006 Winter Olympics
Alpine skiers at the 2010 Winter Olympics
Sportspeople from Sofia